Haresabad (also Romanized as Ḩāres̄ābād; also known as Ḩādes̄ābād and Hārisābād) is a village in Ramsheh Rural District, Jarqavieh Olya District, Isfahan County, Isfahan Province, Iran. At the 2006 census, its population was 395, in 112 families.

References 

Populated places in Isfahan County